McGregor is an unincorporated community in Montgomery County, in the U.S. state of Georgia.

History
A post office called McGregor was established in 1890, and remained in operation until 1953. The community was named after Alexander McGregor, the original owner of the town site.

References

Unincorporated communities in Montgomery County, Georgia